Pharwala Fort is a 15th-century fort located about 40 km from Rawalpindi in Punjab, Pakistan. The fort is naturally defended by one side by a small Himalayan range and the other by the Swaan River.

History
The fort was originally built in the 11th century by Sultan Kaigohar Gakhar. The Mughal Emperor Babur conquered the fort in 1519. In 1857, the fort came under British rule and remained under them until the 1947 Independence. The fort was then handed over to the Government of Pakistan.

Conservation

Being situated in the Kahuta area, it is only open for Pakistani visitors.

An old and huge Banyan tree is also found inside the fort.

See also

List of UNESCO World Heritage Sites in Pakistan
List of forts in Pakistan
List of museums in Pakistan
Sar Jalal
Rohtas Fort
 Rawat Fort
 Mankiala stupa

References

Forts in Punjab, Pakistan
Rawalpindi District
Kallar Syedan Tehsil